The YJ-8 (NATO reporting name: CSS-N-4 Sardine) is a Chinese surface-launched subsonic anti-ship cruise missile. It is manufactured by the China Aerospace Science and Industry Corporation (CASIC) Third Academy.

The YJ-8 was developed into air-launched (YJ-81) and submarine-launched (YJ-82) variants.

Description
The YJ-8 is either based on, or is a heavily modified copy of, the MM38 Exocet; the two missiles share virtually identical operational profiles. The replication of the MM38's "revolutionary flight profile" in less than ten years and with an immature industrial base strongly suggests that China had access to proven technology.

The YJ-8 was a "radical departure" from China's first anti-ship missiles derived from the P-15 Termit. The YJ-8 carried a smaller warhead, but had the same range and speed while being significantly smaller and lighter.

Development
The development of the YJ-8 was approved in late-1976 following a few years of encouraging work on solid-fuel rockets. According to a 1991 Aerospace China article, development of the missile's engine began in 1978, and flight testing was completed in 1985. The YJ-8 reach initial operating capability in the People's Liberation Army Navy in 1987, the same year the export version—the C-801—was announced.

CASIC received the first National Science and Technology Advancement Award for development of the YJ-8 in 1988.

C-801
The C-801 is the export version of the YJ-8. The C-801 was not marketed after 2003.

Variants
YJ-8: Basic version with fixed wings
YJ-8A: Modified YJ-8 with folding wings.
YJ-81: Air-launched version without the booster.
 YJ-82: Submarine-launched version.
C-801: Export version of YJ-8.
C-801K: Export version of the YJ-81.
C-801Q: Export version of YJ-82.

Operators

Islamic Republic of Iran Air Force, C-801K

Myanmar Navy, C801

People's Liberation Army Navy

Royal Thai Navy, C-801

Yemeni Navy, C-801

References

Bibliography

Guided missiles of the People's Republic of China
Anti-ship cruise missiles of the People's Republic of China
Air-to-surface missiles
Weapons of the People's Republic of China
Military equipment introduced in the 1990s